Jeremy D. Barnes (born April 13, 1987) is an American professional baseball hitting coach for the New York Mets of Major League Baseball (MLB).

Barnes attended the University of Notre Dame and played college baseball for the Notre Dame Fighting Irish. He played professional baseball for the Philadelphia Phillies organization and in Australia from 2009 through 2015.

After retiring as a player, Barnes began working on player development for the Canberra Cavalry of the Australian Baseball League. He spent four years working in the front office for the Houston Astros, including two years as their minor league hitting coordinator. The New York Mets interviewed Barnes for their position of director of playing development. Though they chose Kevin Howard, the Mets hired Barnes for the newly established position of director of player development initiative.

Before the 2022 season, the Mets promoted Barnes to their major league coaching staff as their assistant hitting coach. After the 2022 season, Eric Chavez was promoted to bench coach and Barnes became the head hitting coach.

References

External links

Jeremy Barnes: Notre Dame Fighting Irish

1987 births
Living people
Williamsport Crosscutters players
Lakewood BlueClaws players
Clearwater Threshers players
Reading Phillies players
Lehigh Valley IronPigs players
Canberra Cavalry players
Camden Riversharks players
New Jersey Jackals players
Major League Baseball hitting coaches
New York Mets coaches
People from Rowlett, Texas
Notre Dame Fighting Irish baseball players
American expatriate baseball players in Australia